The 1982 FIFUSA Futsal World Championship was the inaugural FIFUSA Futsal World Cup (now known as AMF Futsal World Cup). The tournament was held by Brazil from 30 May to 6 June in São Paulo. Ten national teams from four confederations (five from South America, three from Europe, one from Asia and one from North America) participated in the tournament.

Venues
All matches were played in one venue: Ginásio do Ibirapuera in São Paulo.

Teams

 (host nation)

First round
The group winners and runners up advanced to the round of 16.

Group A

Group B

Knockout phase
In the knockout stages, if a match is level at the end of normal playing time, extra time shall be played (two periods of five minutes each) and followed, if necessary, by kicks from the penalty mark to determine the winner.

Classification 1st–4th

Semifinals

Third place match

Final

Ranking

|-
| colspan="11"| Eliminated in the group stage
|-

References

AMF Futsal World Cup
1982 in futsal
International futsal competitions hosted by Brazil
World Cup
FIFUSA Futsal World Cup
FIFUSA Futsal World Cup